Richard Adolf Zsigmondy (1 April 1865 – 23 September 1929) was an Austrian-born chemist. He was known for his research in colloids, for which he was awarded the Nobel Prize in chemistry in 1925, as well as for co-inventing the slit-ultramicroscope, and different membrane filters. The crater Zsigmondy on the Moon is named in his honour.

Biography

Early years
Zsigmondy was born in Vienna, Austrian Empire, to a Hungarian gentry family. His mother Irma Szakmáry, a poet born in Martonvásár, and his father, Adolf Zsigmondy Sr., a scientist from Pressburg (Pozsony, today's Bratislava) who invented several surgical instruments for use in dentistry. Zsigmondy family members were Lutherans. They originated from Johannes Sigmondi (1686–1746, Bártfa,  Kingdom of Hungary) and included teachers, priests and Hungarian freedom-fighters. Richard was raised by his mother after his father's early death in 1880, and received a comprehensive education. He enjoyed hobbies such as climbing and mountaineering with his siblings. His elder brothers, Otto (a dentist) and Emil (a physician), were well-known mountain climbers; his younger brother, Karl Zsigmondy, became a notable mathematician in Vienna. In high school Richard developed an interest in natural science, especially in chemistry and physics, and experimented in his home laboratory.

He began his academic career at the University of Vienna Medical Faculty, but soon moved to the Technical University of Vienna, and later to the University of Munich, to study chemistry under Wilhelm von Miller (1848–1899). In Munich he conducted research on indene and received his PhD from the University of Erlangen in 1889.

Career
In 1885 Zsigmondy published his very first article as a joint publication with his Viennese professor Rudolf Benedikt on a method of determining glycerin. His 1887 article Neue Lüster und Farben auf Glas (about colours on glass) marked the beginning of a research area on which he would work for another 30 years. Zsigmondy left organic chemistry to join the physics group of August Kundt at the University of Berlin.

In July 1892 Zsigmondy held a colloquium at Graz University of Technology assessed among others by Albert von Ettingshausen and Friedrich Emich in order to qualify as assistant professor.  There he also completed his habilitation in 1893. Because of his knowledge about glass and its colouring, in 1897 the Schott Glass factory offered him a job which he accepted. He invented the Jenaer Milchglas and conducted some research on the red Ruby glass. Lecturing activities in Graz were documented until 1899.

Zsigmondy left Schott Glass in 1900, but remained in Jena as private lecturer to conduct his research. Together with the optical instrument manufacturer Zeiss, he developed the slit ultramicroscope. His scientific career continued in 1908 at the University of Göttingen, where he stayed for the rest of his professional career as professor of inorganic chemistry. In 1925, Zsigmondy received the Nobel Prize for Chemistry for his work on colloids and the methods he used, such as the ultramicroscope upon which based his investigation on the Purple of Cassius.

Before Zsigmondy finished his PhD thesis in organic chemistry, he published research on colouring glass with silver salts and dissolved silver particles, which he recovered by dissolving the glass in hydrofluoric acid. 

During his stay in Graz, Zsigmondy accomplished his most notable research work, on the chemistry of colloids. The exact mechanism which yields the red colour of the Cranberry or Ruby glass was a result of his studies of colloids.

In later years he worked on gold hydrosols and used them to characterize protein solutions. While in Jena he developed the slit ultramicroscope together with Henry Siedentopf. After moving to Göttingen, Zsigmondy improved his optical equipment for the observation of finest nanoparticles suspended in liquid solution. As a result, he introduced the immersion ultramicroscope in 1912.

Together with Wilhelm Bachmann, Zsigmondy developed a new membrane filter (1916). He later transferred his patents to a company established by him, other shareholders and Sartorius AG which was incorporated to Sartorius in the late 1970s.

Private life

In 1903 Zsigmondy married Laura Luise Müller, with whom he had two daughters, Annemarie and Käthe.

Richard Zsigmondy passed away due to his suffering from arteriosclerosis only a few month after retiring from his university position in Göttingen in early March.

He was a cousin of the architect Frigyes Schulek, whose mother was Auguszta Zsigmondy. He is also related to the violinist Dénes Zsigmondy.

Ancestry 

{| class="wikitable"
|+Zsigmondy
|-
|-
| rowspan="8" align="center"| Richard Zsigmondy, Vienna (A) 1862–Göttingen (D) 1929 scientist, Nobel Prize Winner in chemistry 1925
| rowspan="4" align="center"| Father:Adolf ZsigmondyPressburg/ Pozsony, (HUN) 1816– Vienna (A) 1880
| rowspan="2" align="center"| Grandfather:Sámuel ZsigmondyPilis, (HUN) 1788–1833 Pressburg/ Pozsony (HUN)
| align="center"| Great-grandfather:G. Zsigmondy Körmöcbánya (HUN) 1748-Pilis (HUN) 1799
| align="center"| Great-great-grandfather:J. Zsigmondy Bártfa (HUN) ca 1700-Körmöcbánya(HUN) 1765
| align="center"| Great-great-grandmother:Zsuzsanna KossovitsBesztercebánya (HUN) ? -Lónyabánya (HUN) 1790
|-
| align="center"| Great-grandmother:Judit Polereczky Alberti (Now Albertirsa) (HUN) 1756–1833 Pressburg/Pozsony (HUN)
|-
| rowspan="2" align="center"|  Grandmother:Friderika Fábry1793 Pressburg/ Pozsony (HUN)–1868 Pressburg/Pozsony (HUN)
| align="center"| grandmother's father:István Fábry Hrussó (HUN) 1751 – Pressburg/ Pozsony (HUN) 1817
|-
| align="center"| grandmother's mother:Terézia Bayer 
|-
| rowspan="4" align="center"| Mother:Irma von SzakmáryMartonvásár (HUN) 1835Vienna 1900
| rowspan="2" align="center"| Mothers father:N.N. von Szakmáry(1818–1888)
| align="center"| Mother's grandfather :
|-
| align="center"|N.N.: 
|-
| rowspan="2" align="center"| Mothers mother:Mária Gegus von Kisgessény  ? 1800  Pressburg/ Pozsony (HUN) 18 September 1883
| align="center"| N.N. :Sámuel Gegus 
|-
| align="center"| NN:''''|}

Honours
 Nobel Prize in Chemistry (1925, awarded in 1926)
 Member of the Göttingen Academy of Sciences and Humanities, Göttingen (since 1914)
 Corresponding member of the Academia de Ciencias de Zaragoza, the Austrian Academy of Sciences and academies/academic societies in Valencia and Harlem.
 Honorary doctorates of TU Wien (1917), Graz University of Technology (1928), and the medical faculty of the University of Königsberg.

Selected publications

See also
Gold number

References

Further reading

 External links 

  including the Nobel Lecture, December 11, 1926 Properties of Colloids''
 

1865 births
1929 deaths
20th-century Austrian chemists
20th-century Hungarian chemists
20th-century Hungarian physicists
Hungarian inventors
Microscopists
Optical physicists
Academic staff of the University of Göttingen
Nobel laureates in Chemistry
Hungarian Nobel laureates
Austrian Nobel laureates
Austro-Hungarian Nobel laureates
Austrian people of Hungarian descent
Scientists from Vienna
University of Vienna alumni
TU Wien alumni
University of Erlangen-Nuremberg alumni
Academic staff of the Humboldt University of Berlin
Academic staff of the Graz University of Technology